Siah Yinkan (also Romanized as Sīāh Yīnkān) is a village in Ashar Rural District, Ashar District, Mehrestan County, Sistan and Baluchestan Province, Iran. At the 2006 census, its population was 13, in 4 families.

References 

Populated places in Mehrestan County